Luohou Temple is a Buddhist temple located in Dongyang Town of Liuyang, Hunan, China. It is adjacent to the Lens Technology.

History
Lingsheng Temple was first established in 693, the 2nd year of Changshou period, at the dawn of Zhou dynasty (690–705), the modern temple was founded in 2008.

During the Cultural Revolution, the Red Guards had attacked the temple and it was completely destroyed.

In 1984, the local people reconstructed the temple on a small scale.

In early 2008, the temple started the reconstruction project. The construction began in August 2008 and the temple was completed in 2013.

Architecture
Lingsheng Temple consists of more than 10 buildings.

Hall of Four Heavenly Kings
Maitreya is enshrined in the Hall of Four Heavenly Kings and at the back of his statue is a statue of Skanda. Statues of Four Heavenly Kings stand on the left and right sides. They are the eastern Dhṛtarāṣṭra, the southern Virūḍhaka, the western Virūpākṣa, and the northern Vaiśravaṇa.

Mahavira Hall
The Mahavira Hall is the second hall and main hall in the temple. In the middle is Sakyamuni, statues of Bhaisajyaguru and Amitābha stand on the left and right sides of Sakyamuni's statue. The statues of Eighteen Arhats stand on both sides of the hall. At the back, Statues of Longnü (left), Guanyin (middle) and Sudhana (right) are enshrined in the hall.

Hall of Medicine King
The Hall of Medicine King is the third hall of the temple for the worship of Hua Tuo, Sun Simiao, Zhang Zhongjing, Bian Que and Li Shizhen. The name of the Hall of Medicine King derives from Sun Simiao's honorific title "Medicine King".

Gallery

References

Buildings and structures in Liuyang
Buddhist temples in Hunan
Tourist attractions in Changsha
2008 establishments in China
21st-century Buddhist temples
Religious buildings and structures completed in 2008